The Trafford Mausoleum,  is a memorial in Wroxham, Norfolk, England. Commissioned after the death of Sigismund Trafford Southwell in 1827, the mausoleum was designed by Anthony Salvin in Gothic Revival style.  It is a Grade II listed structure.

History and architecture
The building has been used to bury members of the Trafford family. The Traffords of Wroxham Hall (now demolished) held land in the area from the Middle Ages.

Sigismund Trafford Southwell, High Sheriff of Norfolk in 1818, died in 1827. His wife Margaret approached Anthony Salvin to design a mausoleum which was constructed c.1830. It was built in the churchyard of St Mary the Virgin, Wroxham. Salvin exhibited the design at the Royal Academy in 1830. The style is Early English Gothic, described in the Norfolk 1: Norwich and the North-East volume of Pevsner as a; "correct, rather cold later 13th century style". The mausoleum is a Grade II listed structure.

Notes

References
 

Buildings and structures in Norfolk
Gothic Revival architecture in Norfolk
Grade II listed buildings in Norfolk
Mausoleums in England
Monuments and memorials in Norfolk
Grade II listed monuments and memorials
Anthony Salvin buildings